Kuruvilassery  is a village in Thrissur district in the state of Kerala, India.

Demographics
 India census, Kuruvilassery had a population of 8296 with 3974 males and 4322 females.

References

Villages in Thrissur district